The Shire of Grenville was a local government area southwest of the regional city of Ballarat, Victoria, Australia.

History

Grenville was first incorporated as a road district on 27 August 1861, and became a shire on 16 February 1864.

On 6 May 1994, the Shire of Grenville was abolished, and along with the Shires of Bannockburn and Leigh and parts of the Shire of Buninyong, was merged into the newly created Golden Plains Shire.

Wards

The Shire of Grenville was divided into four ridings on 16 May 1977, each of which elected three councillors:
 Delacombe Riding
 East Riding
 North Riding
 West Riding

Towns and localities
 Bonshaw
 Cape Clear
 Delacombe
 Haddon
 Happy Valley
 Linton*
 Nintingbool
 Piggoreet
 Scarsdale
 Smythesdale
 Smythes Creek

* Council seat.

Population

* Estimate in 1958 Victorian Year Book.

Gallery

References

External links
 Victorian Places - Grenville Shire

Grenville